Mburku is an Afro-Asiatic language spoken in Bauchi State, Nigeria.

Notes 

Languages of Nigeria
West Chadic languages